This is a complete list of appearances by members of the professional playing squad of West Ham United F.C. during the 1959–60 season.

English football clubs 1959–60 season
1959-60
1959 sports events in London
1960 sports events in London